Ben Mertens (born 13 October 2004) is a Belgian snooker player. He won the World Open Under-16 Snooker Championships in 2018.

Career
Ben Mertens is from Wetteren. When he was 12 years old, he reached the 2nd round of the 2017 EBSA European Under-18 Snooker Championship. At the 2018 EBSA European Under-18 Snooker Championship he got to the quarter finals, where he lost from the later champion Jackson Page.

He won the Belgian U18 championship in 2018. In August 2018 he played in a professional ranking tournament for the first time, and beat Adam Stefanow in the first round of the 2018 Paul Hunter Classic.

In October 2018, when he was thirteen years old, he won the World Open Under-16 Snooker Championships, becoming the first male Belgian snooker world champion (Wendy Jans is a multiple winner of the senior women's world championship).

In January 2019, he defeated Michael White, then ranked #36 in the world, at a snooker tournament in Bruges.

At the 2019 Snooker Shoot-Out, a ranking tournament for which he got a wild card, he beat James Wattana in the first round.

In March 2020 he lost in the semi-finals of the EBSA European Under-21 Snooker Championships to later champion Aaron Hill.

In July 2020 he defeated James Cahill in the first round of the World Championship qualifiers, becoming the youngest player ever to win a match in the World Championships. This record was broken by Liam Davies, who was two days younger than Mertens when he won his first match at the 2022 World Snooker Championship qualifiers.

In June 2022 turned professional after winning the EBSA European Under-21 Snooker Championships and gained a two-year tour card for the 2022–23 and 2023–24 snooker seasons.

Performance and rankings timeline

Career finals

Amateur finals: 4 (3 titles)

Notes

External links
Official website

2004 births
People from Wetteren
Belgian snooker players
Living people
Sportspeople from East Flanders
21st-century Belgian people